National parks in India are IUCN (International Union of Conservation of Nature) category II protected areas. India's first national park was established in 1936, now known as Jim Corbett National Park, in Uttarakhand. By 1970, India only had five national parks. In 1972, India enacted the Wildlife Protection Act and Project Tiger in 1973 to safeguard the habitats of conservation reliant species. Now there are 106 national parks in India.

Further federal legislation strengthening protection for wildlife was introduced in the 1980s.

Hemis National Park is largest national park with an area 4,400 km² of while South Button Island National Park is smallest with an area of just 5.19 km².

Definition 
According to the Indian Ministry of Environment & Forests, a national park is "[a]n area, whether within a sanctuary or not, [that] can be notified by the state government to be constituted as a National Park, by reason of its ecological, faunal, floral, geomorphological, or zoological association or importance, needed to for the purpose of protecting & propagating or developing wildlife there in or its environment. No human activity is permitted inside the national park except for the ones permitted by the Chief Wildlife Warden of the state under the conditions given in CHAPTER IV, WPA 1972".

Overview

Map
{
  "type": "ExternalData",
  "service": "geoshape",
  "properties": {
    "stroke": "#f00f00",
    "stroke-width": 1
  },
  "query": "\nSELECT ?id ?idLabel (concat('', ?idLabel, '') as ?title) WHERE\n{\n?id wdt:P31 wd:Q46169. # is a road\n ?id wdt:P17 wd:Q668 . # in India\n\nSERVICE wikibase:label { bd:serviceParam wikibase:language 'en'.\n?id rdfs:label ?idLabel .\n}\n}"}

State wise list
Source :

Andaman and Nicobar Islands

Andhra Pradesh

Arunachal Pradesh

Assam

Bihar

Chhattisgarh

Goa

Gujarat

Haryana

Himachal Pradesh

Jammu and Kashmir

Jharkhand

Karnataka

Kerala

Ladakh

Madhya Pradesh

Maharashtra

Manipur

Meghalaya

Mizoram

Nagaland

Odisha

Rajasthan

Sikkim

Tamil Nadu

Telengana

Tripura

Uttar Pradesh

Uttarakhand

West Bengal

See also 

 List of wildlife sanctuaries of India
 Ministry of Environment, Forest and Climate Change
 Indian Council of Forestry Research and Education
 Botanical Survey of India
 Botanical Survey of India
 Zoological Survey of India

Notes

it is the protected place for wildlife ..
 it is managed by legislative

References

External links 

India
 
National parks